is a Japanese manga series by Yoshiie Gouda. The series was adapted by Yukihiko Tsutsumi into a film, known in Japan under the same title and in the United States as Happily Ever After. Viz Pictures licensed the film for release in the United States.

Yukie works at a noodle shop for long hours while Isao is a lazy gangster. Yukie's friends ask her to leave her husband, but Yukie feels an obligation to him because Isao had initially saved her from misery.

The film aired in a selection of theaters in the United States.

Principal cast
 Miki Nakatani as Yukie
 Hiroshi Abe as Isao
 Toshiyuki Nishida as Yukie's father

References

External links
  
  
  at Viz Pictures
 

2007 films
Japanese romantic comedy-drama films
Live-action films based on manga
Films directed by Yukihiko Tsutsumi
Films scored by Hiroyuki Sawano
2000s Japanese-language films
Manga series
Manga adapted into films
New People films
Kobunsha